

Ulrich Heyse (20 September 1906 in Berlin-Friedenau – 19 November 1970 in Flensburg) was a German U-boat commander in World War II and recipient of the Knight's Cross of the Iron Cross.

Awards
Wehrmacht Long Service Award 4th Class (4 October 1937)
Iron Cross (1939)
2nd Class (11 February 1940)
1st Class (24 March 1942)
Destroyer War Badge (19 October 1940)
U-boat War Badge (1939) (24 March 1942)
Knight's Cross of the Iron Cross on 21 January 1943 as Kapitänleutnant and commander of U-128

References

Citations

Bibliography

 
 
 

1906 births
1970 deaths
Military personnel from Berlin
Recipients of the Knight's Cross of the Iron Cross
Reichsmarine personnel
U-boat commanders (Kriegsmarine)
People from Tempelhof-Schöneberg